Each winner of the 1989 Governor General's Awards for Literary Merit received $5000 and a medal from the Governor General of Canada.  The winners and nominees were selected by a panel of judges administered by the Canada Council for the Arts.

English language

Fiction

Winner:
Paul Quarrington, Whale Music

Other Finalists:
Ann Copeland, The Golden Thread 
Helen Weinzweig, A View from the Roof

Poetry
Winner:
Heather Spears, The Word for Sand

Other Finalists:
Tim Lilburn, Tourist to Ecstasy 
Stephen Scobie, Dunino

Drama
Winner:
Judith Thompson, The Other Side of the Dark

Other Finalists:
Tomson Highway, Dry Lips Oughta Move to Kapuskasing
John Krizanc, Tamara

Non-fiction
Winner:
Robert Calder, Willie-The Life of W. Somerset Maugham

Other Finalists:
Janice Boddy, Wombs and Alien Spirits 
Robert MacNeil, Wordstruck 
Dale A. Russell, An Odyssey in Time: The Dinosaurs of North America

Children's literature – text
Winner:
Diana Wieler, Bad Boy

Other Finalists:
Kit Pearson, The Sky is Falling 
Eliane Corbeil Roe, Circle of Light

Children's literature – illustration
Winner:
Robin Muller, The Magic Paintbrush

Other Finalists:
Michèle Lemieux, A Gift from Saint Francis 
Jan Thornhill, The Wildlife 123

Translation (French to English)
Winner:
Wayne Grady, On the Eighth Day

Other Finalists:
Arlette Francière, Kaleidoscope 
Donald Winkler, Rose and Thorn

French language

Fiction

Winner:
Louis Hamelin, La Rage

Other Finalists:
Robert Lalonde, Le Diable en personne 
Jacques Poulin, Le Vieux Chagrin

Poetry
Winner:
Pierre DesRuisseaux, Monème

Other Finalists:
Christiane Frenette, Cérémonie mémoire 
Élise Turcotte, La Terre est ici

Drama
Winner:
Michel Garneau, Mademoiselle Rouge

Other Finalists:
Michel Marc Bouchard, Les Muses orphelines 
Robert Claing, La Femme d'intérieur

Non-fiction
Winner:
Lise Noël, L'Intolérance : une problématique générale

Other Finalists:
Jean Éthier-Blais, Fragments d'une enfance 
Pierre Morency, L'Oeil américain

Children's literature – text
Winner:
Charles Montpetit, Temps mort

Other Finalists:
Jacques Lazure, Le Domaine des Sans Yeux 
Joceline Sanschagrin, La Fille aux cheveux rouges

Children's literature – illustration
Winner:
Stéphane Poulin, Benjamin et la saga des oreillers

Other Finalists:
Frédéric Back, L'Homme qui plantait des arbres 
Philippe Béha, Mais que font les fées avec toutes ces dents?

Translation (English to French)
Winner:
Jean Antonin Billard, Les Âges de l'amour

Other Finalists:
Ronald Guévremont, Comme un vent chaud de Chine 
Christine Klein-Lataud, Un Oiseau dans la maison

Governor General's Awards
Governor General's Awards
Governor General's Awards